Beach is a hamlet in South Gloucestershire, England, on the lower northern slopes of Lansdown Hill. It is about 1 mile north-west of Upton Cheyney. Beach was designated as a conservation area on 23 October 1989.

During the English Civil War the Battle of Lansdowne was fought, on 5 July 1643, in fields nearby Beach.

Britton's Farm is the major property in the village. Formerly much of the village and surrounding area was part of the Beach House estate.

A Forest of Avon Trust community woodland, The Retreat, is to the east of the village. The Retreat was planted in 2000 under a Millennium Commission programme, and previously managed by the Woodland Trust.

References

Villages in South Gloucestershire District